The Ukrainian Greek Catholic Archparchy or Archdiocese of (São João Batista em) Curitiba is a Ukrainian Greek Catholic archeparchy located in the city of Curitiba, which is also the Metropolitan see of a Roman Catholic Ecclesiastical province in Curitiba in Brazil.  The ecclesiastical province has one suffragan, the 
Eparchy of Imaculada Conceição in Prudentópolis (Ukrainian).

History 
It was established on May 30, 1962 as Apostolic Exarchate (exempt, i;e. directly subject to the Holy See, not part of any ecclesiastical province) of Brazil. On November 29, 1971, the exarchate was promoted as the Eparchy (diocese) of São João Batista em Curitiba.

Bishops

Episcopal ordinaries
So far, its exarchs and (arch)bishops -often monks in the Eastern tradition- always belonged to the Basilian order.

 Apostolic Exarchs of Brazil (Ukrainian Catholic Rite) 
 Bishop José Romão Martenetz (1962.05.30 – 1971.11.29; cfr. infra)

 Eparchs (Bishops) of São João Batista em Curitiba (Ukrainian Catholic Rite)
 Bishop José Romão Martenetz (cfr. supra; 1971.11.29 – 1978.03.10)
 Bishop Efraím Basílio Krevey (1978.03.10 – 2006.12.13)
 Bishop Valdomiro Koubetch (2006.12.13 – 2014.05.12; cfr. infra)

 Metropolitan Archeparch(s (Archbishops)
 Archeparch Valdomiro Koubetch (cfr. supra; 2014.05.12 – present)

Coadjutor bishops
Efraím Basílio Krevey (Krevei)  (1971-1978)
Valdomiro Koubetch (2003-2006)

Auxiliary bishops
Meron Mazur (2005-2014), appointed Bishop of Imaculada Conceição in Prudentópolis (Ukrainian)
Daniel Kozelinski Netto (2007-2016), appointed Bishop of Santa María del Patrocinio en Buenos Aires (Ukrainian), Argentina

References and External Links 
 GCatholic.org
 Catholic Hierarchy

Eastern Catholic dioceses in Brazil
Sao Joao Batista em Curitiba, Ukrainian Catholic Eparchy of
Christian organizations established in 1962
Ukrainian diaspora in Brazil
Curitiba
Roman Catholic dioceses and prelatures established in the 20th century
Organisations based in Curitiba